Central Division, sometimes referred to as the Quilon Division was one of three (or four) administrative subdivisions of the princely state of Travancore in what is now Kerala. It was administered by a civil servant of rank Diwan Peishkar equivalent to a District Collector in British India and consisted of 8 taluks — Karthikapally, Thiruvalla, Pathanamthitta, Ambalappuzha, Chengannur, Kunnathur, Karunagappalli, Pandalam, Mavelikkara, Quilon and Kottarakara. The headquarters was the town of Quilon.

See also 
 Northern Division (Travancore)
 Southern Division (Travancore)
 Trivandrum Division

References 

Divisions of Travancore